Bishopton is a historic home located at Church Hill, Queen Anne's County, Maryland.  It is a -story, brick dwelling, three bays wide, and one room deep with a hall-parlor plan in the 18th century Tidewater Maryland/Virginia vernacular style It was built about 1711.  The facades are laid in Flemish bond and the upper gables feature glazed chevron patterns.

The house was listed on the National Register of Historic Places in 1985.

References

External links
, including photo from 1985, at Maryland Historical Trust

Hall and parlor houses
Houses on the National Register of Historic Places in Maryland
Houses in Queen Anne's County, Maryland
Houses completed in 1730
Federal architecture in Maryland
Historic American Buildings Survey in Maryland
National Register of Historic Places in Queen Anne's County, Maryland
1730 establishments in the Thirteen Colonies